Mustafa Nadhim Jari Al-Shabbani (born 23 September 1993 in Al-Diwaniyah, Iraq) is an Iraqi footballer who plays as a defender for Iraqi Premier League club Al-Shorta, on loan from Jordanian club Al-Faisaly, and the Iraq national team.

The defender played University football in Diwaniya, aged 16 when in Iraq most people would begin university at 18. In that same year, 2010, Mustafa helped guide his University to the Southern Universities Championship title for the first time with a comfortable 2–0 victory over Kufa University with one of the goals scored by future Olympic player Safa Jabar.

Club career

Al Najaf

Mustafa started his career at Al Najaf where he spent three seasons with club, scoring nine goals.

Al Quwa Al Jawiya 

Mustafa signed for Al Quwa Al Jawiya for the 2013/14 season in which the team finished 4th. He left the team at the end of the season, signing for Erbil.

Erbil SC

Mustafa spent 2015 with northern club Erbil, before leaving due to financial problems.

Naft Al Wasat

Mustafa signed for reigning champions Naft Al-Wasat ahead of the 2015/16 season, he left in the winter transfer window in 2017.

Al Mina'a 

On 27 January 2017, Mustafa signed for Basrah Club Al-Minaa. He made his debut vs Al-Hussein on February 24, keeping a clean sheet in a 1–0 away victory.

International career
Mustafa Nadhim was one of Hakim Shaker's youth players and after sitting on the bench throughout the 23rd Gulf Cup in Saudi Arabia, he was given his international debut by his mentor in an unofficial friendly against Malaysia. The defender played at right back that day and scored an acrobatic overhead kick. On February 6, 2013 Mustafa Nadhim made his official International debut against Indonesia in the 2015 AFC Asian Cup qualification.

International goals
Scores and results list Iraq's goal tally first.

Honors

Club
Al-Shorta
 Iraqi Premier League: 2018–19

Al-Faisaly
 Jordanian Pro League: 2022

International
Iraq Youth team
 2012 AFC U-19 Championship: runner-up
 2013 FIFA U-20 World Cup: 4th Place
Iraq U-23
 AFC U-22 Championship: 2013
Iraq
 21st Arabian Gulf Cup: runner-up
 25th Arabian Gulf Cup: winner

References

External links
 Defender Mustafa Nadhim

1993 births
Living people
Iraqi footballers
Olympic footballers of Iraq
Footballers at the 2014 Asian Games
Asian Games medalists in football
Asian Games bronze medalists for Iraq
Medalists at the 2014 Asian Games
Footballers at the 2016 Summer Olympics
Iraq international footballers
Association football midfielders
Al-Mina'a SC players
Al-Shorta SC players
Al-Diwaniya FC players